Roofline is used to describe the fascia, soffits, bargeboards, antefixes and cladding that forms the frontage immediately below the roof and the eaves of many homes and buildings. These  are traditionally made from wood, but can be made of a variety of different materials, including plastic, such as polyvinyl chloride.

Fascia 

Fascia is a term used in architecture to refer to a frieze or band running horizontally and situated vertically under the roof edge or which forms the outer surface of a cornice and is visible to an outside observer. This is to say that the long dimension of the surface is horizontal and the short dimension is vertical.
As the literal meaning is "band" it is also used, although less commonly, for other such band-like surfaces like a wide, flat strip around a doorway, different and separate from the wall surface.
The word fascia derives from Latin "fascia" meaning "band, bandage, ribbon, swathe". The word is pronounced with the "long-a" sound, /ˈfeɪʃə/, rhyming with the Japanese word geisha.

Specifically, used to describe the horizontal "fascia board" which caps the end of rafters outside a building, which can be used to hold the rain gutter. The finished surface below the fascia and rafters is called the soffit or eave. A soffit is also often installed between the ceiling and the top of wall cabinets in a kitchen, set at a 90 degree angle to the horizontal soffit which projects out from the wall.

In classical architecture, the fascia is the plain, wide band across the bottom of the entablature, directly above the columns. The "guttae" or drip edge was mounted on the fascia in the Doric order, below the triglyph.

In steep-slope roofing, a board that is nailed to the ends of a roof rafter; sometimes supports a gutter. In low-slope roofing, the horizontal trim located at the perimeter of a building is usually a border for the low-slope roof system.

Soffit 

Soffit (from French soffite, formed as a ceiling; directly from suffictus for suffixus, Latin suffigere, to fix underneath), in architecture, describes the underside of any construction element.

In popular use, soffit most often refers to the material forming a ceiling from the top of an exterior house wall to the outer edge of the roof, i.e., bridging the gap between a home's siding and the roofline, otherwise known as the eaves. When so constructed, the soffit material is typically screwed or nailed to rafters known as lookout rafters or lookouts for short.
Soffit exposure profile (from wall to fascia) on a building's exterior can vary from a few centimetres (2-3 inches) to 3 feet or more, depending on construction. It can be non-ventilated, or ventilated for cooling  attic space.

Gutter 

A rain gutter (also known as eavestrough (especially in Canada), eaves channel guttering or simply as a gutter) is a narrow channel, or trough, forming the component of a roof system which collects and diverts rainwater from the  roof.

A rain gutter may be constructed in several ways:

a roof integral trough along the lower edge of the roof slope which is fashioned from the roof covering and flashing materials.
a discrete trough of metal, or other material that is suspended beyond the roof edge and below the projected slope of the roof.
a wall integral structure beneath the roof edge, traditionally constructed of masonry, fashioned as the crowning element of a wall.

The main purpose of a rain gutter is to protect a building's foundation by channeling water away from its base. They also help to reduce erosion, prevent leaks in basements and crawlspaces, protect painted surfaces by reducing exposure to water, and provide a means to collect rainwater for later use.

Rain gutters can be constructed from a variety of materials, including cast iron, lead, zinc, galvanised steel, painted steel, copper, painted aluminium, PVC (and other plastics), concrete, stone, and wood.

Water collected by a rain gutter is fed, usually via a downspout (traditionally called a leader or conductor), from the roof edge to the base of the building where it is either discharged or collected. A collection system strategy for water carried from rain gutters may include a rain barrel or a cistern.

Bargeboard

Bargeboard (probably from Medieval Latin bargus, or barcus, a scaffold, and not from the now obsolete synonym vergeboard) is a board fastened to the projecting gables of a roof to give them strength and to mask, hide and protect the otherwise exposed end of the horizontal timbers or purlins of the roof to which they were attached. Bargeboards are sometimes moulded only or carved, but as a rule the lower edges were cusped and had tracery in the spandrels besides being otherwise elaborated. The richest example in Britain is one at Ockwells in Berkshire (built 1446-1465), which is moulded and carved as if it were intended for internal work.
 

Roofs